The 4th European Athletics U23 Championships were held in Bydgoszcz, Poland at the Zdzisław Krzyszkowiak Stadium between 17 and 20 July 2003.

Results 
Complete results and medal winners were published.

Men's

Women's

†: In the 1500 metres event, Rasa Drazdauskaitė from Lithuania ranked initially 2nd (4:12.16), but was disqualified for infringement of IAAF doping rules.

Medal table

Participation
According to an unofficial count, 816 athletes from 46 countries participated in the event.

 (3)
 (1)
 (5)
 (2)
 (44)
 (23)
 (1)
 (5)
 (12)
 (5)
 (23)
 (3)
 (17)
 (33)
 (61)
 (1)
 (62)
 (53)
 (27)
 (22)
 (2)
 (18)
 (4)
 (34)
 (14)
 (1)
 (12)
 (1)
 (2)
 (2)
 (5)
 (18)
 (8)
 (68)
 (11)
 (18)
 (48)
 (2)
 (5)
 (10)
 (6)
 (41)
 (28)
 (13)
 (6)
 (35)

References

European U23 Championships results (Archived 2009-08-11). GBR Athletics. Retrieved on 2009-08-05.
Results (archived)

 
European Athletics U23 Championships
E
European Athletics U23 Championships
Sport in Bydgoszcz
International athletics competitions hosted by Poland
European Athletics U23 Championships
European Athletics U23 Championships
European Athletics U23 Championships
History of Bydgoszcz